Marriage value, also called synergistic value, is a concept in property valuation. It is defined by the Royal Institution of Chartered Surveyors as "an additional element of value created by the combination of two or more assets or interests where the combined value is more than the sum of the separate values".

In England and Wales, the term is most often encountered in leasehold enfranchisement where a valuation is undertaken with a view to extending a residential lease or purchasing the freehold of a residential property held on a ground lease. The issue arises as it is common practice in England for flatsand occasionally housesto be sold on the basis that the purchaser obtains a lease usually of 99 years or longer at a modest rentdescribed as a ground rentand pays close to a freehold price for doing so, although The Leasehold Reform (Ground Rent) Act 2022 which came into force on 30 June 2022 changed this practice by requiring almost all new residential leases to have an almost-zero (peppercorn) ground rent.  .

A ground lease is a wasting asset to the leaseholder because the value of the property declines relative to its long lease value as the lease becomes shorter. In the absence of legislation allowing leaseholders to extend their lease the property would revert to the freeholder upon expiry of the lease at which point the value of the leaseholder's interest would be nil. Legislation provides that a qualifying leaseholder may extend their lease on payment of compensation to the freeholder. Part of that compensation is a proportion of the increase in value to the flat resulting from the lease extension. For example, a property may be worth £300,000 if it has a 99 year lease but only be worth 85% of that value if the lease has only 70 years remaining. If the leaseholder is entitled to extend the lease to 99 years or more, they have the opportunity to increase the value of their interest in the property by £45,000, which is the marriage value brought about by merging the existing 70 years and the longer lease value. Leasehold legislation in the UK recognises that this marriage value would result in a windfall to the lessee when the lease extends and therefore provides that this marriage value is split, generally on a 50/50 basis, between the freeholder and leaseholder - although there is specific provision that if there is more than 80 years remaining on the lease at the time of application to extend the leaseholder is not under an obligation to pay any marriage value to the freeholder.

The term marriage value is likely a misnomer in residential lease extension as two interests are not being combined, rather one is being extended, but the term remains widely used in the valuation of leasehold property in the UK. There are other circumstances where marriage value may be applicable and the term synergistic value is more often used in those contexts.

References

Real estate